The moonwalk or backslide is a dance move in which the performer glides backwards but their body actions suggest forward motion. The moonwalk is a popping move. It became popular around the world following Michael Jackson's moonwalk during the performance of "Billie Jean" on Motown 25: Yesterday, Today, Forever, which was broadcast on May 16, 1983, and he included it in tours and live performances. Jackson has been credited as renaming the "backslide" to the moonwalk and it became his signature move.

Technique 

An illusion is involved in creating the appearance of the dancer gliding backwards. Initially, the front foot is held flat on the ground, while the back foot is in a tiptoe position. The flat front foot remains on the ground but is sliding lightly and smoothly backward past the tip-toe back foot. What is now the front foot is lowered flat, while the back foot is raised into the tiptoe position. These steps are repeated over and over creating the illusion that the dancer is being pulled backwards by an unseen force while trying to walk forward. Variations of this move allow moonwalking to appear to glide forward, sideways, or even in a circle.

History

1930s
There are many recorded instances of the moonwalk; similar steps are reported as far back as 1932, used by Cab Calloway. In 1985, Calloway said that the move was called "The Buzz" when he and others performed it in the 1930s.

1940s
In 1943, Bill Bailey performed the first on-screen backslide in the movie The Cabin in the Sky. This dance move closely resembles what was later called the moonwalk. In 1944, Judy Garland and Margaret O'Brien portrayed something similar to the move in their performance of "Under the Bamboo Tree" in Meet Me in St. Louis, though their performance lacks the illusion created by the genuine moonwalk.

1950s and 1960s
In 1958, on the Pat Boone Show, Dick Van Dyke performed a similar variation of the moonwalk and camel walk in his comedy routine called "Mailing a Letter on a Windy Corner".

In 1955, it was recorded in a performance by tap dancer Bill Bailey. He performs a tap routine, and at the end, backslides into the wings. The French mime artist Marcel Marceau used it throughout his career (from the 1940s through the 1980s), as part of the drama of his mime routines. In Marceau's "Walking Against the Wind" routine, he pretends to be pushed backwards by a gust of wind.

In 1958, Mexican dancer-comedian Adalberto Martinez "Resortes" also performed the moonwalk in the film Colegio de Verano ("Summer School").

In a November 1969 episode of H.R. Pufnstuf, Judy the Frog teaches everyone a new dance called "The Moonwalk", which includes two instances of a stationary moonwalk.

1970s
On the April 9, 1970 episode of The Dick Cavett Show, Marcel Marceau demonstrated several kinds of "mime walks," one of which was a backslide. Cavett tried to do it himself but found it too difficult.

In 1972, Lucie Arnaz in Here's Lucy Episode 9 of Season 5 "Lucy and Jim Bailey" Lucie does the moonwalk while singing "Fever" with Jim Bailey

Choreographer Bob Fosse moonwalks in his role as the Snake in the 1974 film The Little Prince.

In the late 1970s, the long-running African-American TV dance show Soul Train featured a dance troupe called "The Electric Boogaloos" which routinely performed popping and locking dance moves including the moonwalk.

It has also been acknowledged that the professional wrestlers Michael "Purely Sexy" Hayes, Terry Gordy, and Buddy Roberts started doing the moonwalk as their trademark ring entrance by 1979 when they formed a wrestling stable known as The Fabulous Freebirds.

1980s
James Brown used the move.

In 1980, in the music video for their single "One Step Ahead" by New Zealand rock band Split Enz, keyboardist Eddie Rayner is seen performing a predecessor of the moonwalk, and Nigel Griggs (former bassist for Split Enz) allegedly taught him how to perform it.

In 1981, in the promotional single and music video "Crosseyed and Painless" by new wave band Talking Heads, authentic street dancers, picked by David Byrne, are featuring, including Stephen "Skeeter Rabbit" Nichols doing the moonwalk.

Another early moonwalker was popper and singer Jeffrey Daniel, who moonwalked in a performance of Shalamar's "A Night to Remember" on Top of the Pops in the UK in 1982 and was known to perform backslides in public performances (including weekly Soul Train episodes) as far back as 1974. Michael Jackson was a fan of Jeffrey Daniel's dancing and would eventually seek him out.

Also in 1982, Debbie Allen performs a moonwalk during a scene with Gwen Verdon in Season 1, Episode 10 ("Come One, Come All") of the TV series Fame.

In Flashdance, the move was used in the B-boy scene, where Rock Steady Crew's Mr. Freeze (Marc Lemberger), with an umbrella prop, mimed the wind blowing him backward as he first walks forward, fighting the wind, then starts moonwalking backwards. Mr. Freeze's version was also shown in the first hip hop movie Wild Style and Malcolm McLaren film clip "Buffalo Gals".

Donnie Yen performs a moonwalk in the 1984 Hong Kong film Drunken Tai Chi.

In the 1984 movie Streets of Fire, actor and performer Stoney Jackson executed a moonwalk as the leader of a fictional group, The Sorels, who lip-synced to the Dan Hartman song "I Can Dream About You". The movie was filmed in the northern spring of 1983, also predating the iconic Michael Jackson moonwalk.

Michael Jackson and the moonwalk 

Singer Bobby Brown of New Edition was the one of "three kids" Jackson said taught him the dance step in his autobiography Moonwalk. It had been rumored that Jeffrey Daniel taught Michael Jackson the moonwalk after the latter saw Daniel perform on Soul Train and had his manager call the show to introduce him to the dancer. Daniel was touring with Shalamar at the time, so Derek Cooley Jackson and Caszper Candidate went to teach Jackson. However, Jackson, who later became known as Cooley Jaxson, was not able to pick up and master the technique until Daniel returned from tour and worked with him. Michael Jackson first performed the dance in public on March 25, 1983 during the television special, Motown 25: Yesterday, Today, Forever, in front of a live audience at the Pasadena Civic Auditorium. The dance became world-famous two months later when the show made its television premiere. Dressed in his signature black trousers, silver socks, silver shirt, black-sequined jacket, and rhinestoned glove, Jackson spun around, posed, and began moonwalking. Music critic Ian Inglis later wrote that Jackson encapsulated a long tradition of African-American dance movements in that one performance. Moonwalking received widespread attention, and from then on, the moonwalk became Jackson's signature move for his song "Billie Jean". Nelson George said that Jackson's rendition "combined Jackie Wilson's athleticism with James Brown's camel walk". Michael Jackson's autobiography was titled Moonwalk, and he also starred in a 1988 film titled Moonwalker.

2000s
Alexei Kovalev has been known for using the moonwalk in his National Hockey League career. He performed the move after scoring a goal on February 7, 2001, and on January 3, 2010. Kovalev moonwalked onto the ice after being named one of the stars of the game and again after scoring in a 2008 celebrity charity soccer game. In 2009, R&B singer The-Dream teamed up with Kanye West to create the Synthpop-R&B record "Walkin' on the Moon", in which The-Dream includes a Jackson-inspired high note. The music video does not feature the moonwalk, though it plays on the premise with a CGI moon background and a simple 2-step by the singer to give the impression he is "walkin' on the moon."

2010s 

In 2017, Jason Derulo briefly used the moonwalk in his song "Swalla".

In 2018, Alessia Cara briefly used the moonwalk in the music video for her song "Trust My Lonely."

In 2019, street dancer Salif Gueye performed the moonwalk in David Guetta's music video for the song "Stay (Don't Go Away)".

In 2019, Chinese boy group WayV released a song called "天选之城 (Moonwalk)". The moonwalk is featured in the music video.

2020s

In 2020, the band Puscifer briefly features the moonwalk in their video "Apocalyptical" and it is also mentioned in the song's lyrics.

In 2020, South-Korean boy band BTS performed the moonwalk briefly in the music video of their song "Dynamite".

References

African-American dance
Funk dance
Novelty and fad dances
Dance in the United States
Dance moves
Popping (dance)
Michael Jackson
Articles containing video clips
1980s fads and trends
1980s neologisms
Walking